Johann Heinrich Meyer (2 March 1812 in Braunschweig – 4 November 1863 in Braunschweig; also known as Heinrich Meyer) was a German bookseller and publisher.

References

1812 births
1863 deaths
Businesspeople from Braunschweig
People from the Duchy of Brunswick
German booksellers
German publishers (people)